The Northwest Ohio League first sponsored football in 1921. This is a list of its annual standings since establishment.

Northwest Ohio League standings

References

Northwest Ohio League
Standings
Northwest Ohio League football standings